The Ho Chi Minh City Post Office, or the Saigon Central Post Office, is a post office in the downtown Ho Chi Minh City, near Saigon Notre-Dame Basilica, the city's cathedral. The building was constructed when Vietnam was part of French Indochina in the late 19th century. It counts with Gothic, Renaissance and French influences. It was constructed between 1886 and 1891 and is now a tourist attraction.

It was designed by Alfred Foulhoux, but is often erroneously credited as being the work of Gustave Eiffel or a collaboration between Foulhoux and Hanoi-based Auguste Henri Vildieu. As translated by the historian Tim Doling, the journal Architecte constructeur: Revue du monde architectural et artistique of 15 September 1891 commented: “The inauguration the new Saigon Post Office, which was held on July 14, had been postponed until the return of the Governor General. This monument, adorned with a most artistic façade, is particularly well laid out and well equipped for the different services to which it is intended; it does the greatest honour to the skill and talent of the distinguished Chief Architect of the Colony, M. Foulhoux.”

Inside the Saigon Central Post office of special note are two painted maps that were created just after the post office was built, the first one located on the left side of the building is a map of Southern Vietnam and Cambodia titled Lignes telegraphiques du Sud Vietnam et Cambodge 1892 ("Telegraphic lines of Southern Vietnam and Cambodia 1892"). The second map of greater Saigon is titled Saigon et ses environs 1892 ("Saigon and its surroundings 1892").

Dương Văn Ngộ, known for being the last public letter writer in Vietnam, worked at the office from 1990 to 2021.

Gallery

References

Web Site 
 Ho Chi Minh Post Office

Buildings and structures in Ho Chi Minh City
Post office buildings
Clock towers
French colonial architecture in Vietnam
Tourist attractions in Ho Chi Minh City